Rathsack is a surname. Notable people with the surname include: 

Svend Rathsack (1885–1941), Danish sculptor
Thomas Rathsack (born 1967), Danish soldier and author

Danish-language surnames